The MJHL All-Rookie Team is chosen from the best rookies in the Manitoba Junior Hockey League. The All-Rookie team of individuals consists of one goalie, two defense-men and three forwards. Players on the team are selected at each position for the season based on their performance in that year. Selection for the team members occurs when the season ends in the Manitoba Junior Hockey League.

References 
Manitoba Junior Hockey League
Manitoba Hockey Hall of Fame
Hockey Hall of Fame
Winnipeg Free Press Archives

Rookie
Rookie player awards